The 2012 Tippeligaen was the 68th completed season of top division football in Norway. The competition began on 23 March 2012 and ended on 18 November 2012, with a summer break from 28 May to 30 June. Molde were the defending champions, while Hønefoss and Sandnes Ulf entered as the promoted teams from the 2011 1. divisjon. They replaced Start and Sarpsborg 08 who were relegated to the 2012 1. divisjon. 

On 11 November 2011, Molde won the title with one matchday left to play after a 1–0 home win over Hønefoss. It was their second consecutive league title and also their second top-flight title overall.

Season summary

Strømsgodset were leading the league most of the season, but four matches before the end of the season there were three teams competing for the title. Rosenborg lost out on the title-race after losing to Strømsgodset and Molde. Molde secured the title in the 29th round after they won 1–0 at home, while Strømsgodset lost 2–1 against Sandnes Ulf.

Stabæk were relegated after being positioned at the bottom of the table throughout the season. Ahead of the last round, four teams were fighting against relegation, but Fredrikstad lost their match against the league-winners Molde and were relegated, while Sandnes Ulf finished 14th and played relegation play-offs against Ullensaker/Kisa, the sixth-placed team in the 1. divisjon. Sandnes Ulf won the play-offs 7–1 on aggregate (4–0 away and 3–1 at home), and were not relegated.

The average attendance in 2012 were 7,014 spectators, down from 7,995 in 2011, which was the lowest average attendance in Tippeligaen since 2003.

Teams
Sixteen teams competed in the league – the top fourteen teams from the previous season and the two teams promoted from the 1. divisjon The promoted teams were Hønefoss (returning after a season's absence) and Sandnes Ulf (their first post-World War II top-flight season). They replaced Sarpsborg 08 (relegated after their first ever presence) and Start (ending their three-year spell in the top flight).

Stadiums and locations

Note: Table lists in alphabetical order.

Managerial changes

League table

Positions by round

Relegation play-offs

At the end of the season, Stabæk and Fredrikstad were relegated directly to 1. divisjon, and will be replaced by Start and Sarpsborg who were directly promoted.

Five teams entered a play-off for the last Tippeligaen spot in the 2013 season. These were:
 A) Sandnes Ulf (by virtue of being the 14th placed team in the Tippeligaen)
 B) Sandefjord (by virtue of being the third placed team in the 1. divisjon)
 C) Mjøndalen (by virtue of being the fourth placed team in the 1. divisjon)
 D) Bodø/Glimt (by virtue of being the fifth placed team in the 1. divisjon)
 E) Ullensaker/Kisa (by virtue of being the sixth placed team in the 1. divisjon)

The four 1. divisjon teams first played a single game knockout tournament, with the winner (Ull/Kisa) advancing to a two-legged tie against the Tippeligaen team (Sandnes Ulf) for the 16th and final spot in the 2013 season. Sandnes Ulf retained their Tippeligaen spot with an aggregate 7–1 win over Ull/Kisa.
ResultsSandnes Ulf won 7–1 on aggregate.''

Results

Season statistics

Top scorers

Source:

Top assists

Source:

Discipline

Player
Most yellow cards: 7
 Tremaine Stewart (Aalesund)
Most red cards: 1
23 players

Club
Most yellow cards: 48  
Lillestrøm

Most red cards: 3
Fredrikstad
Sandnes Ulf
Vålerenga

Attendances

Awards

Annual awards

Goalkeeper of the Year 
The Goalkeeper of the Year awarded to  Kenneth Udjus (Sogndal)

Defender of the Year 

The Defender of the Year awarded to  Vegard Forren (Molde)

Midfielder of the Year 
The Midfielder of the Year awarded to  Magnus Wolff Eikrem (Molde)

Striker of the Year 

The Striker of the Year awarded to  Alexander Søderlund (Haugesund)

Coach of the Year 
The Coach of the Year  awarded to  Ole Gunnar Solskjær (Molde)

References 

Eliteserien seasons
1
Norway
Norway